Elsbeth is a given name. Notable people with the name include:

Elsbeth Juda (born 1911), British photographer
Elsbeth Levy Bothe (born 1927), American attorney and judge
Elsbeth Schragmüller (1887–1940), German spy during World War I
Elsbeth Tronstad (born 1956), Norwegian businessperson and politician for the Conservative Party
Elsbeth van Rooy-Vink (born 1973), Dutch cyclist specializing in competitive mountain biking
Elsbeth von Keudell (1857–1953), German nurse, recipient of Florence Nightingale Medal

See also
Thomas Elsbeth (died after 1624), German composer

nl:Elsbeth